Huizhou may refer to:

Huizhou, city in Guangdong, China
Huizhou, Anhui, historical prefecture in Anhui, China
Huizhou District, district in Huangshan (former Huizhou), Anhui
Huizhou Chinese, a topolect of the Chinese language